Pankstraße is a Berlin U-Bahn station located on the U8. It was opened on 5 October 1977 (Rümmler) with the line's extension from Gesundbrunnen to Osloer Straße. The station's name derives from its location: It sits under the intersection of Pankstraße and Badstraße.

The actual spelling of the station's name is under debate. The German orthographic rules call for the spelling "Pankstraße", but the signs inside the station spell "Pankstrasse", acceptable if in capital letters, but not in lower case as used.

Like the station Siemensdamm (Berlin U-Bahn), the station is constructed as a "Multi Purpose Facility". It is prepared and partially stocked to be used as an NBC shelter. It has an emergency kitchen and a filtered ventilation system.  It is specified to sustain 3339 people for 14 days.

References 

U8 (Berlin U-Bahn) stations
Buildings and structures in Mitte
Railway stations in Germany opened in 1977